In mathematics, the Grünwald–Letnikov derivative is a basic extension of the derivative in fractional calculus that allows one to take the derivative a non-integer number of times. It was introduced by Anton Karl Grünwald (1838–1920) from Prague, in 1867, and by Aleksey Vasilievich Letnikov (1837–1888) in Moscow in 1868.

Constructing the Grünwald–Letnikov derivative

The formula 

for the derivative can be applied recursively to get higher-order derivatives.  For example, the second-order derivative would be:

Assuming that the h 's converge synchronously, this simplifies to:

which can be justified rigorously by the mean value theorem. In general, we have (see binomial coefficient):

Removing the restriction that n be a positive integer, it is reasonable to define:

This defines the Grünwald–Letnikov derivative.

To simplify notation, we set:

So the Grünwald–Letnikov derivative may be succinctly written as:

An alternative definition

In the preceding section, the general first principles equation for integer order derivatives was derived. It can be shown that the equation may also be written as

or removing the restriction that n must be a positive integer:

This equation is called the reverse Grünwald–Letnikov derivative. If the substitution h → −h is made, the resulting equation is called the direct Grünwald–Letnikov derivative:

References

Further reading 
 The Fractional Calculus, by Oldham, K.; and Spanier, J. Hardcover: 234 pages. Publisher: Academic Press, 1974. 

Fractional calculus